Sabinianus may refer to:

 Sabinian (proconsul) (fl. 240), proconsul of the Roman province of Africa
 Sabinianus Magnus (died 481), general of the Eastern Roman Empire
 Sabinianus (consul 505) (fl. 505–508), politician and general of the Eastern Roman Empire
 Pope Sabinian (c. 530–606), bishop of Rome 604–606

See also
 Sabinian (disambiguation)